Aragorn (foaled in 2002) is an Irish millionaire Thoroughbred racehorse who won major Graded stakes races in 2005 and 2006.

Career

Aragorn's first race was on 12 July 2004 at Cork, where he came in second place.

He captured his first win at the 2005 Oak Tree Derby.

His next win came on 29 May 2006 at the Shoemaker Mile Stakes. His next race, on 23 July 2006, also resulted in a win at the 2006 Eddie Read Stakes.

On 26 August 2006 he won the Del Mar Mile Handicap, then captured the final win of his career at the 2006 City of Hope Mile Stakes.

Stud career
Aragorn descendants include:

c = colt, f = filly

He retired to stud at Lane's End Farm in Kentucky.

Pedigree

References

 Aragorn's pedigree and partial racing stats
 Stallion Info

2002 racehorse births
Racehorses bred in Ireland
Racehorses trained in the United States
Thoroughbred family 5-h